Following is a list of films produced in 1967 by the Ollywood film industry based in Bhubaneshwar and Cuttack, India.

A-Z

References

See also

1967 in film
1967 in India

1967
Ollywood
Films, Ollywood
1960s in Orissa